James Richard Crotty (March 3, 1938 - November 20, 2021) was an American football defensive back in the National Football League for the Washington Redskins and in the American Football League for the Buffalo Bills. He played college football at the University of Notre Dame and was drafted in the 12th round of the 1960 NFL Draft.

References

1938 births
Living people
American football defensive backs
Buffalo Bills players
Notre Dame Fighting Irish football players
Washington Redskins players
Players of American football from Iowa
Players of American football from Minnesota
People from Buena Vista County, Iowa
People from International Falls, Minnesota
American Football League players